Godzilla 1985 is a 1985 kaiju film directed by R. J. Kizer and Koji Hashimoto. The film is a heavily re-edited American localization of the Japanese film The Return of Godzilla, which was produced and distributed by Toho Pictures in 1984. In addition to the film being re-cut, re-titled, and dubbed in English, Godzilla 1985 featured additional footage produced by New World Pictures, with Raymond Burr reprising his role as American journalist Steve Martin from the 1956 film Godzilla, King of the Monsters!, which itself was a heavily re-edited American adaptation of the 1954 Japanese film Godzilla.

Both the New World Pictures and Toho versions serve as direct sequels to the original 1954 Godzilla, with Godzilla 1985 also serving as a sequel to Godzilla, King of the Monsters!. The same adaptation techniques used to produce Godzilla, King of the Monsters! were implemented with Godzilla 1985, with the original Japanese footage being dubbed and edited together with the American footage. The film retains the original musical score by Reijiro Koroku, while also integrating portions of the score for the 1985 Canadian film Def-Con 4, composed by Christopher Young.

Godzilla 1985 was met with mostly unfavorable reviews upon its release in the United States. However, it had a minor cult success on home video. Like Godzilla, King of the Monsters!, much of the nuclear and political overtones featured in the original Japanese film were removed from the American version. Godzilla 1985 was the last Godzilla film produced by Toho to be distributed theatrically in the United States until the release of Godzilla 2000.

Plot
The Japanese fishing vessel Yahata Maru is trying to find its way to shore in a horrible storm, when a giant monster emerges from an eruption on a nearby uninhabited island and attacks the boat. A day later, reporter Goro Maki finds the vessel intact, along with its sole survivor Hiroshi "Kenny" Okumura.

The Japanese Prime Minister, Mitamura, is informed of the attack and that the monster is Godzilla; he orders that this be kept secret from the public. Maki's report is not published by his newspaper because it is  "national security risk” and could cause mass panic. Maki is told to interview bio-physicist Hayashida instead. Maki finds Naoko, Okamura's sister working as a lab assistant to Hayashida and informs her that her brother is safe, against the government's orders. She rushes to the hospital.

Godzilla attacks and destroys a Soviet submarine. The Russians believe the attack was orchestrated by the Americans and the situation threatens to escalate into war. Mitamura is informed of the submarine attack and shown evidence that Godzilla was responsible. The media blackout is lifted and the Americans are absolved of blame. The Japanese arrange a meeting with the Soviet and American ambassadors. Prime Minister Mitamura decides nuclear weapons will not be allowed in Japanese territory even if Godzilla were to attack the Japanese mainland. The Americans balk at this, while the Soviets are in full agreement. However, a Soviet Navy officer secretly prepares a nuclear satellite, claiming Moscow has ordered this.

Godzilla appears on an island off the coast of Japan and attacks a nuclear power plant, removing the nuclear reactor and feeding off the radiation. Godzilla suddenly drops the reactor and follows a flock of birds back out to sea. The Japan Self-Defense Forces are deployed to wait for a possible attack by Godzilla at Tokyo Bay. General Kakura of the JSDF briefs the Japanese cabinet about a top-secret weapon known as the "Super-X attack plane" that can be used against Godzilla.

Through the use of "ultrasonic images", Hayashida determines that Godzilla's brain is bird-like, only mutated. Hayashida realizes that Godzilla has a conditioned response to birds chirping and suggests they duplicate the sound electronically. Hayashida assists the Japanese emergency task force and plans to lure Godzilla into Mt. Mihara's volcano by emitting bird sound frequencies. The Prime Minister authorizes both the JSDF plan and the plan to use the volcano against Godzilla.

Steve Martin is brought into the Pentagon to assist against Godzilla. Godzilla is sighted in Tokyo Bay,  which is immediately evacuated. Godzilla proceeds to attack Tokyo and the JSDF launch the Super-X. In the attack, Godzilla sinks a Soviet merchant ship which was in actuality an intelligence collection vessel. Before dying of his injuries, the captain launches the nuclear missile.

The Pentagon prepares to assist the Japanese but Martin cautions that weapons will only confuse and antagonize Godzilla further. Hayashida uses the bird signaling device on Godzilla, which works initially, but before it can be tested further, Godzilla is attacked again by the JSDF. The Super-X arrives and defeats Godzilla with cadmium missiles. At that moment, the Soviet missile is detected by the Americans as it draws closer to Japan. When Washington warns that the blast will be 50 times that of the Hiroshima bombing Mitamura permits the Americans to make an interception attempt.

Hayashida and his signaling equipment are evacuated and sent to Mt. Mihara. The Americans launch a counter-missile and successfully intercept the Soviet missile. However, the nuclear blast fallout reawakens Godzilla and it destroys the Super-X. Hayashida relaunches the signal and lures Godzilla into the mouth of Mt. Mihara. Using explosive bombs to cause the mountain to erupt, Godzilla becomes imprisoned after falling into the volcano.

Cast

 Raymond Burr as Steve Martin
 Ken Tanaka as Goro Maki
 Keiju Kobayashi as Prime Minister Seiki Mitamura 
 Yasuko Sawaguchi as Naoko Okumura
 Yosuke Natsuki as Professor Makoto Hayashida
 Shin Takuma as Hiroshi "Kenny" Okumura
 Eitaro Ozawa as Minister of Finance Kanzaki
 Hiroshi Koizumi as Professor Minami
 Mizuho Suzuki as Minister of Foreign Affairs Seiichi Emori
 Taketoshi Naito as Chief Cabinet Secretary Takegami
 Yoshifumi Tajima as Minister of the Environment Hidaka
 Warren J. Kemmerling as General Goodhoe
 James Hess as Colonel Raschen
 Travis Swords as Major McDonough
 Crawford Binion as Lt Oswald
 Justin Gocke as Kyle Martin
 Tony Plana as Goro Maki (voice)
 Paul Wilson as Professor Hayashida (voice)
 Andy Goldberg as Hiroshi (aka Kenny) Okumura (voice)
 Lara Cody as Naoko Okumura (voice)
 Gregory Snegoff as Newscaster/Pilot/Government Official (voice)
 Kenpachiro Satsuma as Godzilla

Production
In early 1985, the trade papers reported that Toho was asking for several million dollars for the North American distribution rights for The Return of Godzilla, and that discussions had taken place with MGM/United Artists and other studios. At one point, a Toho spokesman complained that the best offer ponied up (by an unnamed Hollywood studio) was in the $2 million range. The bidding war didn't last long, and Toho wound up getting far less money. By May, the new Godzilla film had been passed over by the majors and fallen instead into the hands of indie distributor New World Pictures. New World's budget breakdown for Godzilla 1985 is as follows: $500,000 to lease the film from Toho, $200,000 for filming the new scenes and other revisions, and $2,500,000 for prints and advertising, adding up to a grand total of approximately $3,200,000.

After acquiring The Return of Godzilla for distribution in North America, New World put producer Tony Randel in charge of adapting the film for U.S. audiences. Randel and New World believed that The Return of Godzilla had so much inescapably "goofy" content that Americans would never take it seriously, and the only way to make it a success was by emphasizing its campiness. Their initial plan was to dub the Japanese footage into English in a straightforward, no-nonsense manner, and add in new scenes with American actors which would add the desired comic relief. Two screenwriters were recruited: Lisa Tomei wrote the script for the dub, and Straw Weisman wrote the script for the new scenes. Randel eventually decided to retitle the film Godzilla 1985, inspired by one of his childhood favorites, Frankenstein 1970.

Around ten minutes of new footage were added for the New World adaptation, most of it at The Pentagon. New World originally planned to tap Lorne Greene as the star of these new scenes, but Randel suggested that casting Raymond Burr would be a good homage to Godzilla, King of the Monsters!, as Burr had performed the same duty of starring in new American footage for that film. According to Randel, Burr was enthusiastic about the film when offered the role, but after being signed on he made several unusual demands. The new footage was shot over three days, but Burr was only on the set for the first day, and was adamant that he would work no more than eight hours, forcing the director to focus on shooting Burr only and save reaction shots for later. Burr also refused to memorize his lines, insisting that teleprompters be strategically positioned around the set instead, despite the logistical difficulties this presented for the crew. Burr also made clear that he took the concept of Godzilla as an anti-nuclear allegory seriously and would not treat it as a joke. Warren Kemmerling also refused to do comic material, though not out of respect for Godzilla, so the script was revamped to reassign all the comedic lines to Travis Swords.

Filming of the new footage was done at the Raleigh Studios in Los Angeles and a house in Malibu. The "war room" was a large montage of the war room from The Philadelphia Experiment, another film from the same studio.

The poster image was the same as for the Japanese version, but a green tinting was added to Godzilla's charcoal gray skin and the Soviet attack satellite in the upper right corner was removed.

Dr Pepper launched a US$10 million advertising campaign for the film. The soda brand is prominently featured in the new footage, such as a vending machine at The Pentagon.

Changes
Much of the original version was deleted or altered. Here is a partial list of the changes:
Shortened
 Godzilla roars and the crew falls, whereas the audience sees Steve Martin after Godzilla roars.
 Goro's fight with the giant mutated sea louse; the louse's voice was changed.
 The scene where Naoko learns her brother is alive; Goro snaps pictures of them reunited, which angers Naoko because she realizes he only helped her in order to get the scoop.
 The meeting between the Japanese prime minister and the Russian and American ambassadors. Also deleted was a scene following the meeting in which the prime minister explains to his aides how he was able to reach a consensus with both sides. Furthermore, in the Americanized version, this scene appears before Godzilla's attack on the nuclear power plant, whereas in the Japanese version, the scene appears after Godzilla's attack.

Added
 Part of Christopher Young's score from Def Con 4 in several scenes (including Godzilla's attack on the Soviet submarine, the scene where the SDF armored division arrives in Tokyo Bay, and Okumura's near-death experience during the helicopter extraction in Tokyo).
 Stock footage from Godzilla, King Of The Monsters was added as the Americans are talking about Godzilla's first appearance but mention that the attack happened in 1956 rather than 1954. (Godzilla, King Of The Monsterss release year was 1956.)
 After the Super-X hits Godzilla with cadmium missiles, it lets out its Showa era roar before collapsing.  This was not heard in "Return".

Altered
 In the scene in which the vagabond helps himself to the food in a deserted restaurant, the distant sound of Godzilla's footsteps was added to the US version.
 Almost all of Godzilla's rampage through Tokyo. Scenes of a crowd fleeing Godzilla that appeared later in the Japanese version were moved to an earlier point in the movie (and corresponding footage of them gathering around Godzilla after it is knocked out by the Super X was removed), the Super X fight was re-arranged (in the Japanese version, Godzilla fires its atomic ray at the Super X after being hit with cadmium missiles, not before), and various other scenes of destruction were either placed in a different order or deleted completely. 
 Godzilla's first attack on the nuclear power plant. The security guard who first sees Godzilla, is heard screaming as Godzilla walks overhead, implying he is stepped on by Godzilla, whereas no such scream is heard in Return.
 Okumura's first name is changed to Kenny.
 Godzilla's attack on the nuclear power plant is earlier in the story, before the discussion of the Super X and the defense of Tokyo, the opposite order of Return.
In the original film, the Americans are shown to be just as helpless as the Soviets when facing up against Godzilla, whereas in this version, they are given a far more heroic role, with great emphasis being placed on their launch of a nuclear missile to destroy a 'deliberately launched' Soviet missile, which was launched by accident in the original film.

Deleted
 All shots which employed a life-size replica of Godzilla's foot (mostly seen near the end); only one shot of the big foot crushing parked cars during the nuclear power plant scene was kept.
 A shot of an American nuclear missile satellite in space.
 Hayashada and Naoko making a wave generator.
 Professor Hayashida showing Okumura photographs of Godzilla's 1954 attack and later discussing the mutant sea louse with an aide at the police hospital.
 Goro calling his editor from an island.

In addition, the theatrical release (and most home video versions, plus the TV version) was accompanied by Marv Newland's short cartoon, Bambi Meets Godzilla.

The North American version, with the added Raymond Burr footage, runs 87 minutes, 16 minutes shorter than the Japanese version.

The closing narration, spoken by Raymond Burr, is as follows:

Reception

Box office 
Opening on August 23, 1985, in 235 North American theaters, the film grossed $509,502 ($2,168 per screen) in its opening weekend, on its way to a $4,116,710 total gross.

Over time, Godzilla 1985, though not a hit, was partially profitable for New World only with the addition of home video and television syndication (the film debuted on television on May 16, 1986).

It was the last Godzilla film produced by Toho to receive any major release in North American theaters until Godzilla 2000 fifteen years later.

Critical reception 
Godzilla 1985 was negatively received by critics. On review aggregator Rotten Tomatoes, the film has a 27% approval rating based on 11 reviews. On Metacritic, the film has a score of 31 out of 100 based on six critics, indicating "generally unfavorable reviews". Roger Ebert, who gave the film one star in the Chicago Sun-Times, argued that a film can only succeed as a "so bad it's good" experience if the filmmakers have made a sincere effort to create a good film, and pointed out evidence that the makers of Godzilla 1985 were instead deliberately trying to create a "so bad it's good" film, such as how the dialogue is consistently rather than occasionally awful, the conspicuous lack of synchronization in the lip-synching, and the inconsistency of Godzilla's size. He also derided Raymond Burr's scenes due to his character's lack of dramatic involvement with the plot. Similarly, the film's "dire" plot and dialogue were criticised by The Encyclopedia of Scientific Fiction, despite the review praising the special effects. Tom Long of the Santa Cruz Sentinel similarly derided the inconsequentiality of Burr's role. While he considered the film more successful as a "so bad it's good" experience than Ebert did, he felt the appeal got old after the first half hour: "After that you start thinking about all the other things you could be doing instead of watching the same joke repeat itself for another hour."

Vincent Canby of the New York Times also panned the film. He focused mainly on how it failed to update either its themes or special effects from those seen in the 1950s Godzilla films, elaborating that Godzilla "still looks like a wind-up toy, one that moves like an arthritic toddler with a fondness for walking through teeny-tiny skyscrapers" and "What small story there is contains a chaste romance and lots of references to the lessons to be learned from 'this strangely innocent but tragic creature.'"

Awards
The film was nominated for a Stinkers Bad Movie Award for Worst Picture and was also nominated for two Razzie Awards, including Worst Supporting Actor for Raymond Burr and Worst New Star for the new computerized Godzilla.

Home media
Godzilla 1985 has been released in the United States several times on VHS. The first was by New World in the mid-1980s. By March 1986, it had sold 90,000 units at $79.95 each in the United States, generating $7,195,500 in gross revenue and earning  at wholesale. It was one of New World's most successful home video releases at the time.

The second was by Starmaker (under license by R&G Video) in 1992, and the third by Anchor Bay Entertainment in 1997. All VHS home video releases include the Bambi Meets Godzilla animated short. While The Return of Godzilla has been released on DVD and Blu-ray by Kraken Releasing, with an additional dubbed version for the international market, Godzilla 1985 has not been released on either format.

References
 
Notes

External links

 
 
 
 
 Making of Godzilla (1984), a Japanese-language promotional "making of" documentary with English subtitles

1985 films
1980s monster movies
1980s science fiction films
Alternative sequel films
Alternative versions of films
Cold War submarine films
Films about nuclear war and weapons
Films directed by Koji Hashimoto
Films set in Tokyo
Films set in Shizuoka Prefecture
Films set in Virginia
Films shot in Tokyo
Films shot in Los Angeles
Films scored by Christopher Young
Giant monster films
Godzilla films
1980s Japanese-language films
Japanese science fiction films
Japanese sequel films
Kaiju films
New World Pictures films
Reboot films
1980s Russian-language films
1980s English-language films
1980s Japanese films